Phelps Anderson is an American politician and businessman serving as a member of the New Mexico House of Representatives from the 66th district, which includes Roswell, New Mexico.

Early life 
Anderson was born and raised in Roswell, New Mexico, the son of oil magnate Robert Orville Anderson.

Career 
Prior to entering politics, Anderson worked as a businessman, managing his family's investment in oil and real estate. He was first elected to the New Mexico House of Representatives in 1976 and served until 1980. Anderson was an unsuccessful candidate for New Mexico's 2nd congressional district in 2002. He was elected to the New Mexico House of Representatives in 2018 and assumed office on January 15, 2019.

In 2021, Anderson left the Republican Party and registered as an independent.

References 

Living people
New Mexico Independents
New Mexico Republicans
Members of the New Mexico House of Representatives
21st-century American politicians
People from Roswell, New Mexico
Year of birth missing (living people)
Businesspeople from New Mexico
Candidates in the 2002 United States elections
20th-century American businesspeople
21st-century American businesspeople